Anni Albers (born Annelise Elsa Frieda Fleischmann; June 12, 1899 – May 9, 1994) was a German textile artist and printmaker credited with blurring the lines between traditional craft and art.

Early life and education
Anni Albers was born Annelise Elsa Frieda Fleischmann on June 12, 1899 in Berlin, Germany. Her mother was from a family in the publishing industry and her father was a furniture maker. Even in her childhood, she was intrigued by art and the visual world. She painted during her youth and studied under impressionist artist Martin Brandenburg, from 1916–19, but was very discouraged from continuing after a meeting with artist Oskar Kokoschka, who upon seeing a portrait of hers asked her sharply "Why do you paint?"

Fleischmann eventually decided to attend art school, even though the challenges for art students were often great and the living conditions harsh. Such a lifestyle sharply contrasted the affluent and comfortable living that she had been used to. She attended the Kunstgewerbeschule in Hamburg for only two months in 1919, then in April 1922 began her studies at the Bauhaus at Weimar.

At the Bauhaus she began her first year under Georg Muche and then Johannes Itten. Fleischmann struggled to find her particular workshop at the Bauhaus. Women were barred from certain disciplines taught at the school and during her second year, unable to gain admission to a glass workshop with future husband Josef Albers, Fleischmann deferred reluctantly to weaving, the only workshop available to women. Fleischmann had never tried weaving and believed it to be too "sissy" of a craft. With her instructor Gunta Stölzl, however, Fleischmann soon learned to appreciate the challenges of tactile construction and began producing geometric designs. In her writing, titled Material as Metaphor, Albers mentions her Bauhaus beginnings: "In my case it was threads that caught me, really against my will. To work with threads seemed sissy to me. I wanted something to be conquered. But circumstances held me to threads and they won me over."

Career 
In 1925, Fleischmann married Josef Albers, the latter having rapidly become a "Junior Master" at the Bauhaus. The school moved to Dessau in 1926, and a new focus on production rather than craft at the Bauhaus prompted Albers to develop many functionally unique textiles combining properties of light reflection, sound absorption, durability, and minimized wrinkling and warping tendencies. She had several of her designs published and received contracts for wall hangings.

For a time, Anni Albers was a student of Paul Klee, and after Walter Gropius left Dessau in 1928 the Albers moved into the teaching quarters next to both the Klees and the Kandinskys. During this time, the Alberses began their lifelong habit of traveling extensively: first through Italy, Spain, and the Canary Islands. In 1930, Albers received her Bauhaus diploma for innovative work: her use of a new material, cellophane, to design a sound-absorbing and light-reflecting wallcovering.

When Gunta Stölzl left the Bauhaus in 1931, Albers took over her role as head of the weaving workshop, making her one of the few women to hold such a senior role at the school.

The Bauhaus at Dessau was closed in 1932 under pressure from the Nazi party and moved briefly to Berlin, permanently closing a year later in August 1933. Albers, who was Jewish, made the move with her husband and the Bauhaus to Berlin, but then fled to North Carolina, where the couple was invited by Philip Johnson to teach at the experimental Black Mountain College, arriving stateside in November 1933. Albers served as an assistant professor of art.  The school was focused on "learning by doing" or "hands on learning." In the early 1940s when Albers moved classrooms and the looms were not yet set up, she had her students go outside and find their own weaving materials. This was a basic exercise on material and structure. Albers regularly experimented with different material in her work and this allowed the students to imagine what it might have been like for the ancient weavers. Anni and Josef Albers both taught at Black Mountain until 1949. During these years Albers's design work, including weavings, were shown throughout the US. She received her US citizenship in 1937. In 1940 and 1941, Albers co-curated a traveling exhibition on jewellery from household with one of the Black Mountain students, Alex Reed, that opened in the Willard Gallery in New York City.

In 1949, Albers became the first textile designer to have a solo exhibition at the Museum of Modern Art in New York City. Albers's design exhibition at MoMA began in the fall and then toured the US from 1951 until 1953, establishing her as one of the most important designers of the day. During these years, she also made many trips to Mexico and throughout the Americas, becoming an avid collector of pre-Columbian artwork.

After leaving Black Mountain in 1949, Albers moved with her husband to Connecticut where she set up a studio in her home. After being commissioned by Gropius to design a variety of bedspreads and other textiles for Harvard University, and following the MoMA exhibition, Albers was approached by Florence Knoll to design textiles for the Knoll furniture company. For the next thirty years she worked on mass-producible fabric patterns, creating the majority of her "pictorial" weavings, some of which are still in production over fifty years later. She also published a half-dozen articles and a collection of her writings, On Designing. In 1961, she was awarded the Craftmanship Medal by the American Institute of Architects.

In 1963, while at the Tamarind Lithography Workshop in Los Angeles with her husband for a lecture of his, Albers was invited to experiment with print media. She grew immediately fond of the technique, and thereafter gave up most of her time to lithography and screen printing. She was invited back as a fellow to Tamarind in 1964. Here she created the six print portfolio titled, Line Involvements. Albers wrote an article for the Encyclopædia Britannica in 1963, and then expanded on it for her second book, On Weaving, published in 1965. The book was a powerful statement of the midcentury textile design movement in the United States. Her design work and writings on design helped establish Design History as a serious area of academic study.

In 1976, Albers had two major exhibitions in Germany, and a handful of exhibitions of her design work, over the next two decades, receiving a half-dozen honorary doctorates and lifetime achievement awards during this time as well, including the second American Craft Council Gold Medal for "uncompromising excellence" in 1981. In 2018, the Tate Modern Gallery in London paired with the Kunstsammlung Nordrhein-Westfalen, in Düsseldorf (Germany) for a retrospective exhibition and book of Albers's work.

Albers continued to travel to Latin America and Europe, to design and make prints, and lecture until her death on May 9, 1994, in Orange, Connecticut. Josef Albers, who had served as the chair of the design department at Yale University after the couple had moved from Black Mountain to Connecticut in 1949, predeceased her in 1976.

Legacy 
In 1971, the Alberses founded the Josef and Anni Albers Foundation, a not-for-profit organization they hoped would further "the revelation and evocation of vision through art." Today, this organization not only serves as the office Estate of both Josef Albers and Anni Albers, but also supports exhibitions and publications focused on Albers works. The official Foundation building is located in Bethany, Connecticut, and "includes a central research and archival storage center to accommodate the Foundation's art collections, library and archives, and offices, as well as residence studios for visiting artists."

Albers was inducted into the Connecticut Women's Hall of Fame in 1994.

Artwork
Albers was a designer who worked primarily in textiles and, late in life, with printmaking. She worked with multiple techniques, primarily lithography, embossing, silk-screening, and photo-offset. She produced numerous designs in ink washes for her textiles, and occasionally experimented with jewellery design. Her woven works include many wall hangings, curtains and bedspreads, mounted "pictorial" images, and mass-produced yard material. Her weavings are often constructed of both traditional and industrial materials, not hesitating to combine jute, paper, horse hair, and cellophane. Albers's early works, such as Drapery material (1923–26) and Design for Smyrna Rug (1925), display some of the characteristics that lasted throughout her career, notably her experimentation with colour, shape, scale and rhythm with abstract, crisscrossing geometric patterns. Her work in printmaking was also experimental as she would "print lines multiple times, first positive then negative, [and print] off-register…She would explore the limits and possibilities of her tools." To Albers, "there is no medium that cannot serve art."

Exhibitions

Select solo exhibitions

1940s
 1941 Willard Gallery, New York, "Anni Albers and Alex Reed: Exhibition of Necklaces," May 5–25, 1941
 1943 North Carolina State Art Gallery, State Library Building, Raleigh, North Carolina, "Painting, Prints, and Textiles by Josef and Anni Albers," October 18–29, 1943
 1949 Museum of Modern Art, New York "Anni Albers: Textiles," September 14October 30, 1949 (Exhibition traveled to twenty-six museums in the United States and Canada)

1950s
 1953 Wadsworth Atheneum, Hartford, Connecticut "Josef and Anni Albers: Paintings, Tapestries and Woven Textiles," July 8August 2, 1953
 1954 Honolulu Academy of Art, Honolulu, Hawaii, "Josef and Anni Albers: Painting and Weaving," July 1August 2, 1954
 1959 MIT New Gallery, Cambridge, Massachusetts, "Anni Albers: Pictorial Weavings," May 11June 21, 1959. Exhibition traveled to the Carnegie Institute of Technology, Pittsburgh; Baltimore Museum of Art; Yale University Art Gallery, New Haven, Connecticut, December 10, 1959January 10, 1960; Contemporary Arts Museum, Houston

1960s
 1969 Retina Gallery, Cambridge, Massachusetts, "Anni Albers Lithographs and Screenprints 1963–1969," October 24November 15, 1969

1970s
 1970 Earl Hall Gallery, Southern Connecticut State College, New Haven, Connecticut, "Anni Albers," November 4–24, 1970
 1971 Carlson Library, University of Bridgeport, Bridgeport, Connecticut, "Anni Albers: Lithographs and Screenprints," January 20February 28, 1971
 1973 Pollock Gallery, Toronto, Ontario, Canada, "Anni Albers: Drawings, Prints, Pictorial Weavings," September 30October 27, 1973
 1975 Kunstmuseum Düsseldorf, Düsseldorf, Germany, "Anni Albers: Bildweberei, Zeichnung, Druckgrafik," July 10August 25, 1975. Exhibition traveled to Bauhaus-Archiv, Berlin, Germany, September 9November 11, 1975
 1977 Lantern Gallery, Ann Arbor, Michigan, "Anni Albers," January 12–30, 1977
 1977 Brooklyn Museum, Brooklyn, New York, "Anni Albers: Drawings and Prints," October 1November 11, 1977
 1977 Zabriskie Gallery, New York , New York, "Anni Albers: Prints," October 14November 12, 1977
 1978 Katonah Gallery, Katonah, New York, "Anni Albers: Graphics," December 10, 1978January 14, 1979
 1978 Pollock Gallery, Toronto, Ontario, Canada, "Anni Albers: Recent Work," October 21November 3, 1978
 1979 Joseloff Gallery, Hartford Art School, Hartford, Connecticut, "Graphic Work by Anni Albers," October 3–26, 1979
 1979 Monmouth Museum, Brookdale Community College, Lincroft, New Jersey, "Anni Albers: Prints," April 1979
 1979 Paul Klapper Library, Queens College, New York, "Anni Albers: Graphics," March 5–30, 1979

1980s
 1980 Alice Simsar Gallery, Ann Arbor, Michigan, "Anni Albers: Prints," March 29April 23, 1980
 1980 Morris Museum of Arts and Science, Morristown, New Jersey, "Anni Albers: Evolving Systems," February 17March 3, 1980
 1980 University Art Gallery, University of California Riverside, Riverside, California, "Anni Albers: Prints and Drawings," February 25March 28, 1980
 1980 Mattatuck Museum, Waterbury, Connecticut, "Anni Albers: Prints," January 3–13, 1980
 1982 Silvermine Gallery, New Canaan, Connecticut, "Anni Albers: Prints," January 9February 7, 1982
 1983 Carlson Gallery, University of Bridgeport, Bridgeport, Connecticut, "Anni Albers: Printmaker," November 20December 18, 1983
 1984 Artists Signature Gallery, New Haven, Connecticut, "Anni Albers: Silkscreen Prints," September 23November 2, 1984
 1985 Arts Club, Chicago, Illinois, " Anni Albers: Prints; Ella Bergmann: Drawings; Ilse Bing: Photographs," September–October 1985
 1985 Renwick Gallery, Washington D.C., "The Woven and Graphic Art of Anni Albers," June 12, 1985January 5, 1986
 1989 Villa Stuck, Munich, Germany, "Anni und Josef Albers: Eine Retrospektive," December 15, 1989February 25, 1990. Exhibition traveled to the Josef Albers Museum, Bottrop, Germany, April 29June 4, 1990

1990s
 1990 Museum of Modern Art, New York, "Gunta Stölzl, Anni Albers," February 15July 10, 1990
 1998 Kunstmuseum Bern, Bern, Switzerland, "Josef und Anni Albers: Europa und Amerika," November 6, 1998January 31, 1999
 1999 Peggy Guggenheim Collection, Venice, Italy, "Anni Albers," March 24May 24, 1999. Exhibition traveled to the Josef Albers Museum, Bottrop, Germany, June 12August 29, 1999; Musée des Arts Décoratifs, Paris, September 20December 31, 1999; Jewish Museum (Manhattan), New York, February 27June 4, 2000

2000s
 2001 Davidson Art Center, Wesleyan University, Middletown, Connecticut, "Anni Albers: Works on Paper from The Josef and Anni Albers Foundation," September 4November 4, 2001
 2002 Gus Fisher Gallery, Auckland, New Zealand, "Anni Albers: Works on Paper," May 18July 6, 2002
 2004 Cooper-Hewitt, National Design Museum, New York, "Josef and Anni Albers: Designs for Living," October 1, 2004February 27, 2005
 2004 Fuji Xerox Co., Tokyo, "Print work by Anni and Josef Albers and their life at Black Mountain College," 2004
 2006 Museo Nacional Centro de Arte Reina Sofía, Madrid, Spain, "Anni y Josef Albers. Viajes por Latinoamérica," November 14, 2006February 12, 2007. Exhibition traveled to Josef Albers Museum, Bottrop, Germany, March 11June 3, 2007; Museo de Arte de Lima, Peru, June 27September 23, 2007; Antiguo Colegio de San Ildefonso, Mexico City, Mexico, November 6, 2007March 23, 2008; Museu Oscar Niemeyer, Curitiba, Paraná, Brazil, May 29August 24, 2008

2010s
 2010 Alan Cristea Gallery, London, "Anni Albers: Prints and Studies," March 18April 17, 2010
 2010 Design Museum, London, "Anni Albers: Truth to Materials," March 22May 10, 2010
 2010 Ruthin Craft Centre, Ruthin, Wales, "Anni Albers: Design Pioneer," December 4, 2010February 6, 2011
 2015  Mudec, Museo delle Culture, Milan, "A Beautiful Confluence: Anni and Josef Albers and the Latin American World," October 28, 2015February 21, 2016
 2016 Davis Museum at Wellesley College, Wellesley, Massachusetts, "Anni Albers: Connections," September 28December 18, 2016
 2017 Musée des Beaux-Arts, Le Locle, Le Locle, Switzerland, "Anni Albers: L'Oeuvre Gravé," February 19May 28, 2017
 2017 Mercy Gallery, Loomis Chaffee School, Windsor, Connecticut, "Harmony," April 25May 30, 2017
 2017 Galleria Carla Sozzani, Milan, "Anni Albers: The Prints," June 16September 10, 2017
 2017 Yale University Art Gallery, New Haven, Connecticut, "Small-Great Objects: Anni and Josef Albers in the Americas," February 3June 25, 2017
 2017 Guggenheim Museum Bilbao, Bilbao, Spain, "Anni Albers: Touching Vision," October 6, 2017January 14, 2018
 2018 K20 Kunstsammlung Nordrhein-Westfalen, Düsseldorf, "Anni Albers," June 9September 9, 2018. Exhibition traveled to Tate Modern, London, October 11, 2018January 27, 2019
 2018 Alan Cristea Gallery, London, "Anni Albers Connections: Prints 1963–1984," October 1November 10, 2018
 2019 David Zwirner Gallery, New York, "Anni Albers," September 10October 19, 2019

Select publications
 On Designing. The Pellango Press, New Haven, CT, 1959. Second edition, Wesleyan University Press, Middletown, CT, 1962. First paperback edition, Wesleyan University Press, 1971.
 On Weaving. Wesleyan University Press, Middletown, CT, 1965.
 Albers, Anni, and Gene Baro. Anni Albers. Brooklyn, N.Y. : Brooklyn Museum, Division of Publications and Marketing Services, 1977.

See also
 Fiber art
 Gunta Stölzl
 Margaretha Reichardt
 Otti Berger
 Friedl Dicker-Brandeis
 List of German women artists

References

Further reading

 Anni Albers: Prints and Drawings. University Art Gallery, University of California, 1980.
 
 Coxon, Ann, Briony Fer, and Maria Müller-Schareck, eds (2018). Anni Albers. Yale University Press. .
 
 
 Albers, Anni (July 5, 1968). Interview with Sevim Fesci. Archives of American Art. New Haven, Connecticut.

External links
 , extensive official site
 Anni Albers at the Alan Cristea Gallery
 Anni Albers at the Cooper Hewitt, Smithsonian Design Museum
 
 Anni Albers at the National Gallery of Art
 Anni Albers in the National Gallery of Australia's Kenneth Tyler Collection
 Oral history interview with Anni Albers, 1968 July 5 from the Smithsonian Archives of American Art
 Anni Albers papers, 1924-1969 from the Archives of American Art

1899 births
1994 deaths
People with acquired American citizenship
Bauhaus alumni
Academic staff of the Bauhaus
American art educators
Textile artists
German weavers
20th-century American women artists
20th-century German women artists
20th-century American printmakers
American women printmakers
American textile designers
Artists from Berlin
Jewish American artists
German emigrants to the United States
19th-century German Jews
American people of German-Jewish descent
Women textile artists
German textile artists
Black Mountain College faculty
20th-century textile artists
American women academics
20th-century American Jews